The following is a list of notable deaths in December 2009.

Entries for each day are listed alphabetically by surname. A typical entry lists information in the following sequence:
 Name, age, country of citizenship at birth, subsequent country of citizenship (if applicable), reason for notability, cause of death (if known), and reference.

December 2009

1
Christoph Budde, 46, German football player (Borussia Mönchengladbach), swine flu.
Maurice Clemmons, 37, American felon, perpetrator of the 2009 shooting of Lakewood, Washington, police officers, shot.
Neil Dougall, 88, British footballer (Plymouth Argyle).
Tommy Henrich, 96, American baseball player (New York Yankees).
Bilal Omer Khan, 55, Pakistani general, victim of December 2009 Rawalpindi terrorist attack
Bill Lister, 86, American honky tonk singer.
Alberto Martínez, 59, Uruguayan football player (FK Austria Wien), heart failure.
Cordelia Oliver, 86, Scottish painter, journalist and art critic.
Ramses Shaffy, 76, Dutch singer and actor, esophageal cancer.
Shilendra Kumar Singh, 77, Indian politician, Governor of Rajasthan (2007–2009).
Éva Szörényi, 92, Hungarian actress, Kossuth Prize winner.
Donald Washington, Sr., 79, American jazz tenor saxophonist, lung cancer.

2
Harold A. Ackerman, 81, American federal judge, natural causes.
Luis María Bandrés, 65, Spanish leader of Basque Nationalist Party.
Elizabeth Berridge, 89, British novelist.
Foge Fazio, 71, American football coach, leukemia.
Shoji Hashimoto, 75, Japanese go master, myocardial infarction.
Ikuo Hirayama, 79, Japanese painter, stroke.
Maggie Jones, 75, British actress (Coronation Street).
Jozo Križanović, 65, Bosnian politician, Croat member of the Presidency (2001–2002), complications from surgery.
Brian Morrison, 76, Australian priest and humanitarian.
Luiz Lombardi Neto, 69, Brazilian announcer (Silvio Santos television program), stroke.
Aaron Schroeder, 83, American songwriter, Alzheimer's disease.
Ian Thompson, 74, Australian politician, member of the Western Australian Legislative Assembly (1971–1993).
Vjekoslav Šutej, 58, Croatian conductor, leukemia.
Eric Woolfson, 64, Scottish singer and keyboardist (The Alan Parsons Project), cancer.

3
Ibrahim Hassan Addou, Somali Higher Education Minister, bombing.
Qamar Aden Ali, Somali Health Minister, bombing.
Swadesh Bose, 81, Bangladeshi economist.
Nat Boxer, 84, American Academy Award-winning sound engineer (Apocalypse Now), natural causes.
*Estêvão Cardoso de Avellar, 92, Brazilian Roman Catholic Bishop of Uberlândia (1978–1992).
Paula Hawkins, 82, American politician, Senator from Florida (1981–1987), complications from a fall.
István Iglódi, 65, Hungarian actor.
Leila Lopes, 50, Brazilian actress, suicide.
Bert Main, 90, Australian zoologist.
Brian Harold Mason, 92, New Zealand scientist, renal failure.
Curtis Nkondo, 81, South African politician, activist and diplomat.
Pat Power, 67, Australian politician, member of the Victorian Legislative Council for Jika Jika (1992–1999).
Sam Salt, 69, British rear admiral, captain of  during the Falklands War.
Peter Scanlon, 78, American accountant and chairman (Coopers & Lybrand), cancer.
Åsmund L. Strømnes, 82, Norwegian educationalist.
*Valbjörn Þorláksson, 75, Icelandic decathlete.
Richard Todd, 90, Irish-born British Academy Award-nominated actor (The Hasty Heart, The Dam Busters), (The Longest Day), cancer.
Ahmed Abdulahi Waayeel, Somali Education Minister, bombing.
Bobby Wayne Woods, 44, American convicted rapist, kidnapper and murderer, execution by lethal injection.
Torrie Zito, 76, American pianist and arranger, emphysema.

4
Richard T. Antoun, 77, American anthropologist and professor, stabbed.
Harold Bell, 90, American marketer, licensing agent and technical advisor, creator of Woodsy Owl.
Liam Clancy, 74, Irish folk singer (The Clancy Brothers), pulmonary fibrosis.
Tim Costello, 64, American labor and anti-globalization advocate, pancreatic cancer.
*Matthew Luo Duxi, 90, Chinese Roman Catholic Bishop of Jiading.
Jérôme-Michel-Francis Martin, 68, French Roman Catholic Bishop of Berbérati (1987–1991).
Bryan O'Byrne, 78, American character actor.
Spyridon, 83, Greek Metropolitan Bishop of Lagkadas, after long illness.
Vyacheslav Tikhonov, 81, Russian actor (Seventeen Moments of Spring).
Stephen Toulmin, 87, British philosopher and author, heart failure.
Jordi Solé Tura, 79, Spanish politician and lawyer, co-author of Spanish Constitution and Minister of Culture (1991–1993).
Umaga, 36, American professional wrestler, prescription drug overdose.
Mall Vaasma, 64, Estonian mycologist.
Mary Curtis Verna, 88, American operatic soprano (Metropolitan Opera), complications from a broken hip.
Francis Wilford-Smith, 82, British cartoonist.

5
Jerry Birn, 86, American television writer.
Nina Fishman, 63, British historian and political activist, cancer.
Alfred Hrdlicka, 81, Austrian architect and draughtsman.
Otto Graf Lambsdorff, 82, German politician, Minister of Economics (1977–1982; 1982–1984).
William Lederer, 97, American author (The Ugly American), respiratory failure.
Kálmán Markovits, 78, Hungarian Olympic gold (1952, 1956) and bronze (1960) medalist in water polo.
Tim "Barrel Man" McKernan, 69, American fan of the Denver Broncos, lung failure.
Garfield Morgan, 78, British actor (The Sweeney), cancer.
Malcolm Perry, 80, American attending physician to President John F. Kennedy after his assassination, lung cancer.
Manuel Prado y Colón de Carvajal, 78, Spanish diplomat.
Dumitru Puntea, 66, Moldovan politician.
Jim Rohn, 79, American entrepreneur, author and motivational speaker, pulmonary fibrosis.
Jack Rose, 38, American guitarist, heart attack.
Princess Vimolchatra of Thailand, 88, Thai royal, cousin of King Bhumibol Adulyadej, renal failure.
William A. Wilson (diplomat), 95, American Ambassador to the Holy See (1984–1986).

6
Dennis P. Collins, 85, American politician, mayor of Bayonne, New Jersey (1974–1990).
Rupprecht Geiger, 101, German painter.
Dermott Monteith, 66, Irish cricketer.
John Pittenger, 79, American politician, Pennsylvania Secretary of Education (1972–1976), Parkinson's disease.
Bina Rai, 78, Indian actress (Anarkali), heart attack.
Daouda Sow, 76, Senegalese politician, President of National Assembly (1984–1998).

7
Bruce C. Allen, 54, American guitarist and vocalist (The Suburbs), organ failure.
Frank M. Coffin, 90, American politician, Representative from Maine (1957–1961), complications of aortic aneurysm surgery.
Royden G. Derrick, 94, American general authority of the LDS Church, natural causes.
Al Dorow, 80, American football player (Washington Redskins, New York Titans), bone cancer.
Shunkichi Hamada, 99, Japanese Olympic silver medal-winning (1932) field hockey player.
Rose Kaufman, 70, American screenwriter, cancer.
Lorenzo Ochoa Salas, Mexican archeologist.
Grady Patterson, 85, American politician, South Carolina state Treasurer (1966–1995; 1999–2007), natural causes.
Carlene Hatcher Polite, 77, American novelist, cancer.
Mark Ritts, 63, American actor and puppeteer (Beakman's World), kidney cancer.
Ray Solomonoff, 83, American physicist and artificial intelligence pioneer.
Pyotr Vail, 60, Russian essayist and journalist.

8
James Bingham, 84, British artist.
Kenneth Biros, 51, American convicted murderer, execution by lethal injection.
Joan Bridge, 97, British costume designer. 
Su Cruickshank, 63, Australian jazz singer and actress (Young Einstein), heart and kidney failure.
Luis Días, 57, Dominican musician and songwriter, heart attack.
Dean Fasano, 54, American vocalist (Prophet, Message), coronary artery disease.
John Givens, 83, American basketball coach (Kentucky Colonels, 1967).
Arthur Glasser, 95, American missionary and theologian.
Karel Klančnik, 92, Yugoslavian Olympic ski jumper.
Elza Medeiros, 88, Brazilian nurse, World War II veteran. (Portuguese)
William C. McInnes, 86, American Jesuit, president of Fairfield University (1964–1973); USF (1973–1976).
Anthony Sanusi, 98, Nigerian Roman Catholic Bishop of Ijebu-Ode (1969–1990).
Fred Sheffield, 86, American basketball player.
Sir Philip Watson, 90, British admiral.

9
Luiz Carlos Alborghetti, 64, Brazilian television presenter and politician, lung cancer.
Gene Barry, 90, American actor (The War of the Worlds, Burke's Law, Bat Masterson), heart failure.
Roger Jacobi, 62, British archaeologist.
Sa'ad Khair, 56, Jordanian secret service chief, heart attack.
Piotr Krzywicki, 45, Polish politician, pancreatic cancer.

Kjell Eugenio Laugerud García, 79, Guatemalan President (1974–1978), complications from cancer.
Rodrigo Carazo Odio, 82, Costa Rican politician, President (1978–1982), heart failure.
Faramarz Payvar, 77, Iranian composer and santur player, brain damage.
Onofre Cândido Rosa, 85, Brazilian Roman Catholic Bishop of Jardim (1981–1999).
Goldie Semple, 56, Canadian stage actor, breast cancer.
Norman Sykes, 83, English footballer (Bristol Rovers).

10
Apolonia Muñoz Abarca, 89, American activist.
Gene Carpenter, 70, American football coach.
Dilip Chitre, 70, Indian poet, cancer.
Kenny Dino, 70, American pop singer.
Jean-Robert Gauthier, 80, Canadian MP for Ottawa East (1972–1974), Ottawa—Vanier (1974–1994); Senator (1994–2004), stroke.
Sir John Gingell, 84, British Air Chief Marshal and Black Rod (1985–1992).
Thomas Hoving, 78, American director of the Metropolitan Museum of Art (1967–1977), lung cancer.
Sir Alan Huggins, 88, British jurist, Vice-President of the Court of Appeal of Hong Kong (1980–1987).
Colin James, 83, British Anglican prelate, Bishop of Winchester (1985–1995), chest infection.
József Kóczián, 83, Hungarian table tennis player.
William L. Reilly, 94, American Jesuit and philosophy professor, President of Le Moyne College (1964–1976).

11
Brindley Benn, 86, Guyanese politician, Deputy Prime Minister, natural causes.
Francisco Piquer, 87, Spanish actor.
Ciarán Mac Mathúna, 84, Irish radio presenter and music collector.
Eric Wrinkles, 49, American convicted murderer, execution by lethal injection.

12
Val Avery, 85, American actor (The Killing of a Chinese Bookie).
Klavdiya Boyarskikh, 70, Russian cross-country skier, Olympic gold medalist (1964).
Charles MacAlester Copland, 99, British Anglican priest, Dean of Argyll and The Isles (1977–1979).
Charles Davis, 84, American actor, heart attack.
Ali Gharbi, 54, Tunisian swimmer.
Robert G. Heft, 67, American designer of the 50-star American flag.
Howard Wesley Johnson, 87, American educator, president of MIT (1966–1971).
Napoleon A. Jones Jr., 69, American federal judge.
Manuel Ruiz Sosa, 72, Spanish footballer and coach.
Eugene van Tamelen, 84, American chemist, cancer.

13
Dan Barton, 88, American actor and voice-over actor, heart failure and kidney disease.
Julian Fane, 82, British author.
Moyra Fraser, 86, Australian-born British actress (As Time Goes By).
Yvonne King, 89, American singer (The King Sisters).
Börje Langefors, 94, Swedish engineer and computer scientist.
Arne Næss, 84, Norwegian politician, Mayor of Bergen.
Piergiorgio Nesti, 78, Italian Roman Catholic archbishop of Camerino-San Severino Marche.
Paul Samuelson, 94, American economist, Nobel Prize winner (1970).
Sha'ari Tadin, 77, Singaporean educator and public servant, Parkinson's disease.
Thomas F. Stroock, 84, American politician, Ambassador to Guatemala (1989–1992).
Larry Sultan, 63, American photographer, cancer.
Wilton Cezar Xavier, 62, Brazilian footballer.

14
Alan A'Court, 75, English footballer (Liverpool, England), cancer.
Jack Denham, 85, Australian horse trainer, winner of 1997 Caulfield and Melbourne Cup (Might and Power).
Chris Feinstein, 42, American bassist (The Cardinals).
Stocker Fontelieu, 86, American actor and executive director (New Orleans theatre), complications from a fall.
Conard Fowkes, 76, American actor (Dark Shadows).
Miodrag Jovanović, 87, Serbian Olympic silver medal-winning (1948) footballer.
George McKinnon, 91, American basketball and baseball coach.
David Pecaut, 54, Canadian municipal entrepreneur, colorectal cancer.
Daniel Piscopo, 89, Maltese politician.
Sol Price, 93, American businessman, founder of Price Club, natural causes.

15
Curtis Allina, 87, American businessman, executive of Pez Candy (1955–1979), heart failure.
C. D. B. Bryan, 73, American author (Friendly Fire), cancer.
Sir Chris Clarke, 68, British politician, leader of Somerset County Council.
Milena Müllerová, 86, Czech gymnast, Olympic champion (1948).
Arnaldo Ribeiro, 79, Brazilian Roman Catholic archbishop of Ribeirão Preto (1988–2006).
Oral Roberts, 91, American evangelist, founder of Oral Roberts University, complications from pneumonia.
James Rossant, 81, American architect, designer of Reston, Virginia, leukemia.
Herbert Spiegel, 95, American psychiatrist.

16
Arturo Beltrán Leyva, 48, Mexican drug lord, shot.
Arthur Cores, 52, American businessman, founder of Boston Market, esophageal cancer.
Drexell R. Davis, 88, American politician, Kentucky Secretary of State and state treasurer.
Roy E. Disney, 79, American entertainment executive (The Walt Disney Company), nephew of Walt Disney, stomach cancer.
Karel Dufek, 93, Czechoslovak diplomat, Spanish Civil War veteran.
Yegor Gaidar, 53, Russian politician, acting Prime Minister (1992), thrombus.
Dennis Herod, 86, English footballer (Stoke City).
Fred Honsberger, 58, American radio personality.
T. G. H. James, 86, British egyptologist.
Kelly Kwalik, Indonesian West Papua separatist leader and commander (Free Papua Movement), shot.
Dame Victoire Ridsdale, Lady Ridsdale, 88, British politician, World War II intelligence agent, inspiration for Miss Moneypenny.
Manto Tshabalala-Msimang, 69, South African politician, Minister of Health (1999–2008), complications from a liver transplant.
Vladimir Turchinsky, 46, Russian actor, bodybuilder and showman, heart attack.
Josef Voß, 72, German Roman Catholic Auxiliary Bishop of Munster, Titular Bishop of Thisiduo (since 1988).
Bob Waldmire, 64, American Route 66 artist, cancer.

17
Amin al-Hafiz, 88, Syrian politician, President (1963–1966).
P.R. Anthonis, 98, Sri Lankan surgeon.
Alaina Reed Hall, 63, American actress (Sesame Street, 227), breast cancer.
Chris Henry, 26, American football player (Cincinnati Bengals), blunt force trauma after fall from vehicle.
Warren Hogan, 80, Australian economics professor and government adviser, cancer.
Jennifer Jones, 90, American Academy Award-winning actress (The Song of Bernadette), natural causes.
Michel Leblond, 77, French Olympic footballer.
Miljenko Mihić, 75, Serbian football coach.
Dan O'Bannon, 63, American screenwriter (Alien, Total Recall, Blue Thunder), Crohn's disease.
Samuel Victor Perry, 91, British biochemist.
Hans Pfenninger, 80, Swiss Olympic cyclist.
Albert Ràfols-Casamada, 86, Spanish artist.

18
Fred Bachrach, 95, Dutch art historian.
Charlie Balun, 61, American artist and journalist, cancer.
José Bardina, 70, Spanish-Venezuelan actor, bladder cancer.
Oskar Danon, 96, Bosnian conductor and composer. 
John Henry Fischer, 99, American educator, President of Teachers College, Columbia University (1962–1974), heart failure.
Connie Hines, 78, American actress (Mister Ed), heart failure.
Harold Lundrigan, 81, Canadian businessman.
Archimandrite Joasaph, 47, American Head of the Russian Ecclesiastical Mission in Jerusalem of the ROCOR, cancer.
László Nagy, 88, Hungarian-born Swiss Secretary General of the World Organization of the Scout Movement (1968–1988).
Job (Osacky), 63, American archbishop of the Orthodox Church in America.
Georgina Parkinson, 71, English ballet dancer and ballet mistress, cancer.
Mike Simpson, 47, American politician, Michigan state Representative (since 2006), heart attack.
Del St. John, 78, Canadian-born Austrian ice hockey player. (German)
Bob Willoughby, 82, American photographer, cancer.
Robin Wood, 78, British film critic, leukemia.
Rex Yetman, 76, Canadian bluegrass mandolin player 
Jack Zilly, 88, American football player (Los Angeles Rams).

19
Charles Birch, 91, Australian geneticist.
Tony Bukovich, 94, American ice hockey player (Detroit Red Wings).
Margaret Christensen, 88, Australian actress.
Edith Diaz, 70, Puerto Rican-born American actress, heart failure.
Lincoln Gordon, 96, American diplomat and academic, Ambassador to Brazil (1961–1966), President of Johns Hopkins University (1967–1971).
Grand Ayatollah Hussein-Ali Montazeri, 87, Iranian cleric and dissident, natural causes.
Zeki Ökten, 68, Turkish film director, heart disease.
Kim Peek, 58, American savant, inspiration for Rain Man, heart attack.
Donald Pickering, 76, British actor.
Roger Rawson, 70, American politician, former majority leader of the Utah House of Representatives, liver disease.
Loren Singer, 86, American novelist (The Parallax View).

20

Joan Brosnan Walsh, 71, Irish actress (Fair City), motor neurone disease.
Jack Brownsword, 86, British footballer (Scunthorpe United).
Neil Farrington, 38, British drummer (Cerebral Fix).
Erik Gates, 47, American electrician and model rocket expert (MythBusters), injuries sustained in a fall from roof.
James Gurley, 69, American guitarist (Big Brother and the Holding Company), heart attack.
Jack Hixon, 88, British football scout.
Arun Krushnaji Kamble, 56, Indian Dalit activist, drowned. (body discovered on this date)
Yiannis Moralis, 93, Greek visual artist.
Brittany Murphy, 32, American actress (Clueless, King of the Hill, 8 Mile), pneumonia.
Shari Rhodes, 71, American casting director (Jaws, Close Encounters of the Third Kind, Breaking Bad).
Vera Rich, 73, British poet, journalist, historian, and translator.
Lester Rodney, 98, American sports journalist.
Arnold Stang, 91, American actor (Top Cat, It's a Mad, Mad, Mad, Mad World), pneumonia.
Ira Trombley, 57, American politician, member of the Vermont House of Representatives (since 2002), natural causes.

21
Suryakant Acharya, 80, Indian politician, natural causes.
Jaime Agudelo, 84, Colombian comedian, respiratory failure.
Craigie Aitchison, 83, British painter.
Dick Archer, 82, Australian politician, member of the Tasmanian Legislative Council (1980–1992).
Ann Nixon Cooper, 107, American civil rights activist, mentioned in President Obama's election victory speech.
James Cowley, 90, British recipient of the Distinguished Conduct Medal.
Rick Hube, 62, American politician, member of the Vermont House of Representatives (since 1998).
David Isaacs, 63, Jamaican singer (The Itals).
Pete King, 80, British saxophonist, co-founder of Ronnie Scott's Jazz Club.
Edwin G. Krebs, 91, American Nobel Prize-winning biochemist.
Christos Lambrakis, 75, Greek businessman, publisher and journalist, multiple organ failure.
Marianne Stone, 87, British character actress (Carry On series).

22
Al Bernardin, 81, American restaurateur, inventor of the Quarter Pounder, stroke.
Mick Cocks, 54, Australian guitarist (Rose Tattoo), liver cancer.
Luis Francisco Cuéllar, 69, Colombian politician, Governor of Caqueta, assassination by cut throat.
Michael Currie, 81, American actor (Dark Shadows, Sudden Impact).
Bernhard Droog, 88, Dutch actor, pneumonia.
Milena Dvorská, 71, Czech film actress.
Edward Maitland-Makgill-Crichton, 93, British army general.
Andy Manson, 73, Australian politician, member of the New South Wales Legislative Council (1995–2000).
Duncan Paterson, 66, Scottish rugby union player and administrator.
Sir Bob Phillis, 64, British media executive, cancer.
Albert Scanlon, 74, English footballer (Manchester United), survivor of Munich air disaster.
Piers Wardle, 49, British artist, brain haemorrhage.

23
Lucas Abadamloora, 71, Ghanaian Roman Catholic Bishop of Navrongo-Bolgatanga (1994–2009).
Lilo Allgayer, 94, German Olympic fencer.
Grigory Baklanov, 86, Russian novelist.
Charles Bullen, 90, American politician, Utah House of Representatives (1971–1977) and Senate (1977–1985).
Robert L. Howard, 70, American soldier, Medal of Honor recipient (1971), pancreatic cancer.
Micah Naftalin, 76, American advocate for Soviet Jews.

Ngapoi Ngawang Jigme, 99, Chinese politician, Chairman of the Tibet Autonomous Region (1964–1968; 1981–1983).
Peter O'Hagan, Irish politician.
Edward Schillebeeckx, 95, Belgian theologian.
Rainer Zepperitz, 79, Indonesian-born German double bassist.

24
Marcus Bakker, 86, Dutch politician, party leader of the Communist Party of the Netherlands (1963–1982).
Stan Benjamin, 95, American baseball player (Philadelphia Phillies) and scout (Houston Astros).
Giulio Bosetti, 79, Italian actor and film director, cancer. 
Rafael Caldera, 93, Venezuelan politician, President (1969–1974; 1994–1999).
George Cowling, 89, British weatherman.
Victor Khain, 95, Russian geologist.
Terry Lawless, 76, British boxing manager and trainer.
Henry van Lieshout, 77, Dutch-born Papua New Guinean Roman Catholic Bishop of Lae (1966–2007).
George Michael, 70, American sportscaster and disc jockey, chronic lymphocytic leukemia.
Masahiko Shimura, 29, Japanese singer and musician, co-founder of the rock band Fujifabric.
Eysteinn Þórðarson, 75, Icelandic Olympic skier.Eysteinn Þórðarson
Gero von Wilpert, 76, German literary scientist.
Brian Young, 79, British naval officer.

25
Christopher Bell, 35, American disability studies scholar.
Tony Bellamy, 63, American musician (Redbone), liver failure.
Bill Burich, 92, American baseball player (Philadelphia Phillies).
Charles Capps, 84, American politician, member of Mississippi House of Representatives (1972–2005).
Asheem Chakravarty, 50, Indian jazz fusion musician (Indian Ocean), heart attack.
Vic Chesnutt, 45, American folk rock musician, muscle relaxant overdose.
Rusty Dedrick, 91, American swing and bebop jazz trumpeter.
Knut Haugland, 92, Norwegian explorer and World War II veteran, last surviving member of the Kon-Tiki expedition.
Rick Kane, 55, American football player (Detroit Lions), pneumonia.
Morris E. Lasker, 92, American federal judge, cancer.
Rachel Wetzsteon, 42, American poet, suicide.

26
Charles F. Baird, 87, American politician.
Dennis Brutus, 85, South African poet and anti-Apartheid activist, prostate cancer.
Giuseppe Chiappella, 85, Italian football player and manager.
Peder Lunde, 91, Norwegian Olympic silver medal-winning (1952) sailor.
Arthur McIntyre, 91, British cricketer.
Yves Rocher, 79, French entrepreneur and mayor of La Gacilly, founder of Yves Rocher Cosmetics.
Ihor Ševčenko, 87, Polish philologist.
Percy Sutton, 89, American civil rights activist, politician and attorney, Manhattan Borough President (1966–1977).
Jacques Sylla, 63, Malagasy politician, Prime Minister of Madagascar (2002–2007).
David Taylor, 63, British politician, MP for North West Leicestershire (since 1997), heart attack.
Norval White, 83, American author (AIA Guide to New York City), heart attack.
Felix Wurman, 51, American cellist, cancer.

27
Maryam Babangida, 61, Nigerian First Lady, wife of former President Ibrahim Babangida, ovarian cancer.
Gunnar Kemnitz, 82, Brazilian Olympic diver.
Terry L. Punt, 60, American politician, Pennsylvania State Senator (1989–2009) and State Representative (1979–1988).
Narra Venkateswara Rao, Indian actor, cancer. 
Isaac Schwartz, 86, Russian composer (White Sun of the Desert).
Takashi Takabayashi, 78, Japanese footballer.

28
Allen Batsford, 77, British football manager (Wimbledon), heart attack.
Habib Bourguiba, Jr., 82, Tunisian diplomat and politician, Minister of Foreign Affairs (1964–1970).
D. F. Cartwright, 93, British businessman.
Sir Jack Harman, 89, British general.
Zoltán Horváth, 30, Romanian-born Hungarian basketball player, car accident.
Terry Matte, 66, Canadian television news producer, cancer.
Manfred R. Schroeder, 83, German physicist.
J. David Singer, 84, American political scientist.
Witold Skulicz, 83, Polish artist.
The Rev, 28, American hard rock and heavy metal drummer (Avenged Sevenfold), drug overdose.

29
Roberto Amadei, 76, Italian Roman Catholic monsignor, bishop of Bergamo (1991–2009).
C. Aswath, 71, Indian Kannada singer, liver and renal failure.
Carlo Cerioni, 84, Italian Olympic basketball player. Carlo Cerioni
David Levine, 83, American caricaturist (The New York Review of Books), prostate cancer.
Paul Sapsford, 60, New Zealand rugby union player (Otago, national team), injuries sustained in a jetboat accident.
Akmal Shaikh, 53, Pakistani-born British drug trafficker, executed by lethal injection.
M. S. Sivasankariah, 82, Indian cricket umpire.
Robert H. Smith, 81, American real estate developer and philanthropist, creator of Crystal City, Virginia, stroke.
Steve Williams, 49, American professional wrestler, throat cancer.

30
Anthony Alaimo, 89, American federal judge (Southern District of Georgia).
Bessie Blount Griffin, 95, American inventor and forensic scientist.
Peter Corren, 62, Canadian gay rights activist, cancer.
Adrian Kivumbi Ddungu, 86, Ugandan Roman Catholic Bishop of Masaka.
Maldwyn Evans, 72, Welsh bowler, world champion (1972).
Rowland S. Howard, 50, Australian musician and songwriter (The Birthday Party), liver cancer.
Michelle Lang, 34, Canadian reporter (Calgary Herald), IED explosion.
Ruth Lilly, 94, American philanthropist (Eli Lilly and Company), heart failure.
Alberto Lysy, 74, Argentine violinist and composer.
Gloria Nord, 87, American skater.
Walter Pérez, 85, Uruguayan Olympic sprinter.
Vasiliy Shandybin, 68, Russian politician.
Peter Shirayanagi, 81, Japanese Cardinal of the Roman Catholic Church.
Jacqueline Sturm, 82, New Zealand writer and poet.
Vishnuvardhan, 59, Indian Kannada actor, cardiac arrest.
Abdurrahman Wahid, 69, Indonesian politician, President (1999–2001), heart failure.
Norman Walker, 74, Australian rules footballer.
Perry Wilson, 93, American actress (Fear Strikes Out).

Leon Yao Liang, 86, Chinese bishop.
Ivan Zulueta, 66, Spanish designer and film director. (French)

31
Arthur E. Bartlett, 76, American realtor, co-founder of Century 21, Alzheimer's disease.
Umalat Magomedov, 30, leader of the Vilayat Dagestan, terrorist, killed by Russian troops.
Tod Campeau, 86, Canadian ice hockey player.
Giulio Corsini, 76, Italian football player and manager.
John Cushnie, 66, Irish gardening expert and radio presenter, heart attack.
Cahal Daly, 92, Irish Cardinal of the Roman Catholic church, Primate of All Ireland (1990–1996).
Maurice Dupras, 86, Canadian politician.
Ann Linnea Sandberg, 71, American immunologist.
George M. Holmes, 80, American politician, member of the North Carolina General Assembly (1975–1977, 1979–2009).
Ross Johnstone, 83, Canadian ice hockey player.
Rashidi Kawawa, 83, Tanzanian politician, Prime Minister of Tanganyika (1962) and Tanzania (1972–1977).
Justin Keating, 79, Irish humanist and Labour Party politician (Minister for Industry and Commerce, 1973–1977).
Helen Lewis, 93, Czech-born British dancer and concentration camp survivor.
Guido Lorraine, 97, Polish-born British actor.
William May, 56, American-born Australian artistic director (Walking with Dinosaurs – The Live Experience), pneumonia.
Glauco Onorato, 73, Italian actor and voice actor. 
Bill Powell, 93, American golf course designer, stroke.
Qian Xinzhong, 98, Chinese politician, Minister of Health (1965–1973, 1979–1983).
Youssef Ibrahim Sarraf, 69, Egyptian Chaldean Bishop of Cairo (since 1984).
Frans Seda, 83, Indonesian economist, Minister of Finance (1966–1968).
William Tuohy, 83, American journalist and Pulitzer Prize-winning foreign correspondent, complications from heart surgery.
Mikhail Vartanov, 72, Russian actor.

References

2009-12
 12